The Sind Club is the exclusive members-only club located in Karachi, Sindh, Pakistan. It was started in 1871 and is one of the oldest clubs in Pakistan.

History
The construction of club was started in 1883. It was inaugurated in 1876. 

The club was designed by Colonel Le Mesurier.

Design
A competition was held to select the best design for the club. Richard Burton had warned against the use of Gothic architecture for the club building. Having seen Frere Hall he had said: "the Veneto-Gothic, so fit for Venice, so unfit for Karachi. It is to be hoped that the new club will not adopt Veneto-Gothic." Since limited funds were available for the new club building, a design prepared by a committee member, Le Mesurier, was chosen. When completed, Le Mesurier's building was considered a "princely residence". The first of the Sind Club buildings, which now houses the ladies bar and the dining room, was designed in a southern Italian style. The building suits comfortably in its spacious grounds, its facade employing simple arcading which is composed of semi-circular openings on the ground and first floors, and terminates in pitched roofs.

The other blocks, which were constructed later, generally follow the Indo-Italianate style of the original structure. The club buildings are provided with a generous back set from the road, creating a feeling of exclusiveness and inaccessibility, even though the architectural style is informal and does not rely on pediments and porticoes for effect.

Gentlemen's Club
The Sind Club was exclusively a men's club. Women were only allowed in to attend a ladies' dinner held every two months and the celebrated Sind Club Ball organized once a year. Until 1950 when the Prime Minister of Pakistan lived across the road, the Sind Club was still used almost exclusively by Europeans.

The sign "Women and dogs not allowed" was removed only a day after Quaid-i-Azam Mohammad Ali Jinnah took his oath as Governor-General of Pakistan on August 14, 1947.

Native membership
The first Pakistani members joined the club in 1952. These included Syed Wajid Ali, Colonel Iskander Mirza and Cowasjee Rustom Fakirjee. It took almost two decades before a Pakistani, Masud Karim, became president of the club in 1965. Since then, however, many of Pakistan's social elite have become members.

Female members
Although women are still not allowed to become members in their own right, they can enter and use the club facilities as wives, daughters and guests of members. In addition, a member's widow can continue using the club after the death of her spouse.

Facilities
Facilities at the Sind Club include a swimming pool; tennis and squash courts; a walking track; a billiards room; an outdoor barbecue; a full bakery; a sauna; guest rooms and a newly built fitness centre.

See also 
 List of India's gentlemen's clubs

References

External links
 The Sind Club - Official website

Clubs and societies in Pakistan
Gentlemen's clubs in Pakistan
Sports clubs in Pakistan
Sports venues in Karachi
Heritage sites in Karachi
1883 establishments in British India